The 1890 Timaru by-election was a by-election held on 18 August 1890 during the 10th New Zealand Parliament in the seat of Timaru, a partly urban seat in Canterbury on the East Coast of the South Island.

Background
The by-election was triggered because of the death of sitting member of parliament Richard Turnbull. The election saw William Hall-Jones win the seat over his main opponent, Edward George Kerr.

Kerr had contested the  against Turnbull, and was the proprietor of The Timaru Herald. Hall-Jones had initially refused nomination citing crucial upcoming business interests. However, several locals persisted and Hall-Jones eventually accepted. Hall-Jones, Kerr and W F Alpin were nominated, and after a show of hands went in favour of Hall-Jones a poll was demanded by the supporters of Kerr and Alpin.

Results
The following table gives the election results:

Notes

References

Timaru 1890
1890 elections in New Zealand
Politics of Canterbury, New Zealand
August 1890 events